Christ the King Catholic High School is a coeducational secondary school located in Preston in the English county of Lancashire.

It is a voluntary aided school administered by Lancashire County Council and the Roman Catholic Diocese of Lancaster. The school offers GCSEs and Cambridge Nationals as programmes of study for pupils, and also offers the Duke of Edinburgh's Award programme. The school also has a specialism in maths and computing.

References

External links
Christ the King Catholic High School official website

Secondary schools in Lancashire
Catholic secondary schools in the Diocese of Lancaster
Voluntary aided schools in England
Schools in Preston